Ronald Dwain Warzeka (December 24, 1935 - June 7, 2017) was a former American football player who played one season with the Oakland Raiders. He played college football at Montana State University.

References

1935 births
2017 deaths
American football defensive tackles
Montana State Bobcats football players
Oakland Raiders players
Players of American football from Montana
Sportspeople from Great Falls, Montana
American Football League players